Elections to Lancashire County Council were held on 5 May 2005, on the same day as the 2005 general election.

Each single-member ward in Lancashire was modified by boundary changes. No elections were held in Blackpool or Blackburn as they are unitary authorities outside of the county boundaries.

Result

	
The overall turnout was 60.48% with a total of 523,763 valid votes cast. A total of 4,385 ballots were rejected.

Council composition
Following the election, the composition of the council was:

G - Green Party 
I - Independent 
IT - Idle Toad

Ward results

Burnley

Burnley Central East

Burnley Central West

Burnley North East

Burnley Rural

Burnley South West

Padiham and Burnley West

Chorley

Chorley East

Chorley North

Chorley Rural East

Chorley Rural North

Chorley Rural West

Chorley South

Chorley West

Fylde

Fylde East

Fylde South

Fylde West

Lytham

St Annes North

St Annes South

Hyndburn

Accrington North

Accrington South

Accrington West

Great Harwood

Oswaldtwistle

Rishton and Clayton-le-Moors

Lancaster

Heysham

Lancaster Central

Lancaster East

Lancaster Rural East

Lancaster Rural North

Lancaster South East

Morecambe North

Morecambe South

Morecambe West

Skerton

Pendle

Brierfield and Nelson North

Nelson South

Pendle Central

Pendle East

Pendle West

West Craven

Preston

Preston Central North

Preston Central South

Preston City

Preston East

Preston North

Preston North East

Preston North West

Preston Rural

Preston South East

Preston West

Ribble Valley

Clitheroe

Longridge with Bowland

Ribble Valley North East

Ribble Valley South West

Rossendale

Rossendale East

Rossendale North

Rossendale South

Rossendale West

Whitworth

South Ribble

Bamber Bridge and Walton-le-Dale

Faringdon

Leyland Central

Leyland South West

Penwortham North

Penwortham South

South Ribble Rural East

South Ribble Rural West

West Lancashire

Ormskirk West

Skelmersdale Central

Skelmersdale East

Skelmersdale West

West Lancashire East

West Lancashire North

West Lancashire South

West Lancashire West

Wyre

Amounderness

Fleetwood East

Fleetwood West

Garstang

Poulton-le-Fylde

Thornton Cleveleys Central

Thornton Cleveleys North

Wyreside

Notes

2005 English local elections
2005
2000s in Lancashire